Guido Horn d'Arturo (Trieste, 13 February 1879 – Bologna, 1 April 1967) was an Italian astronomer born in Trieste, then part of the Austrian Empire. He obtained Italian citizenship after serving as a volunteer in the Italian army during the First World War. To avoid being persecuted as an irredentist by the Austrian authorities, he officially added to his surname Horn that of "d'Arturo" which he used in the war.

He was director of the Astronomical Observatory of Bologna from 1921 to 1954, with an interruption of over six years following the persecution for fascist racial laws. In 1931 he founded the magazine Coelum for the dissemination of astronomy in the society.

The asteroid 3744, discovered in 1983, bears the name "Horn-d'Arturo".

Segmented mirror telescope 
In the 1930s, Guido Horn d'Arturo was the creator of the tessellated telescope, a progenitor of segmented mirror telescopes.

In 1932 Horn d'Arturo began to work on a new idea of combining small mirror tassels, to build a larger telescope mirror.  The difficulty of building high quality monolithic glass mirrors with diameters bigger than a few meters was becoming apparent during the development of the 5m Palomar telescope. These mirrors were in any case too expensive for the Italian economy, still struggling after the great depression of 1929. Horn's idea  was to build smaller mirrors of the same spherical section of the larger one in which they would be combined so that the rays reflected by the single elements would converge in the same focal plane and produce a single image of each star in the field of view. This way, spherical aberration would be eliminated, together with other aberrations characteristic of spherical mirrors: a pioneering idea of active optics, commonly used nowadays in modern telescopes. 

In 1935 Guido Horn d'Arturo constructed a 1 m prototype. Some years later in 1952, he assembled a larger 1.8 meter diameter telescope consisting of 61 tassels, which was installed in the astronomical tower in Bologna. More than 17000 photographic plates were obtained by Horn d'Arturo and collaborators who used this telescope for a systematic survey of the local zenithal sky and discovered a dozen of variable stars. Both the prototype and the 1.8 m telescope are exhibited at the  at the University of Bologna.

The original principle devised by Horn d'Arturo is at the foundation of the new generation of multi-mirror telescopes (or segmented mirrors): the Multiple Mirror Telescope in Arizona, built in 1979, the twin telescopes of the Keck Observatory in Hawaii, built between  1993 and 1996, consisting of 36 segments 1.8 m each for a total diameter of 10 meters. On Cerro Armazones in the Atacama Desert in Chile work on the dome of the ELT (Extremely Large Telescope), a 39.3 m telescope composed of 798 segments, started in 2017. The James Webb Space Telescope, launched on 25 December 2021, has a primary mirror composed of 18 hexagonal segments for a diameter of 6.5 m  

The Società Astronomica Italiana (SAIT), and the Istituto Nazionale di Astrofisica (INAF), dedicated the telescope ASTRI (Astrophysics with Mirrors with Italian Replicant Technology), located on the volcano Etna in Sicily, to Horn. On 10 November 2018, with an official ceremony, the telescope was named "ASTRI-Horn".

References

Further reading 
(in English) Bonoli, F. "Guido Horn d'Arturo and the first multi-mirror telescopes: 1932-1952." Memorie della Societa Astronomica Italiana 89 (2018): 448.

External links
 Guido Horn d'Arturo, Biography of Italian astronomers, in Polvere di Stelle: the cultural heritage of Italian astronomy
 Le luci di Horn

1879 births
1967 deaths
20th-century Italian astronomers